Friedrich Jacob Theodor Pflaum (17 July 1846 – 28 July 1923) was an Australian politician who represented the South Australian House of Assembly multi-member seat of Murray from 1902 to 1915, representing the Australasian National League from 1905 to 1910 and the Liberal Union from 1910 to 1915.

Pflaum was a member of the Destitute Board and the board of enquiry which looked into the nurses' dispute at the Destitute Asylum and exonerated Nurse Dunstan.

References

Members of the South Australian House of Assembly
1846 births
1923 deaths